Awatapu College is a State Co-Educational Secondary School in Awapuni, Palmerston North, New Zealand.

About the School

Geography
Awatapu College is located in West End, a suburb of Palmerston North, at the bend of Botanical Road. The area known as "Awatapu" started off as an Oxbow lake on the Manawatu River. It later became a lagoon that provided food and shelter to the local Māori of Rangitane. It also provided food for a variety of birds, pests and eels.

History and Design
The school was officially opened on 1 December 1976 as the fifth secondary school in Palmerston North. Like most New Zealand state secondary schools of the 1970s, Awatapu College was built to the S68 standard plan, characterised by single-storey classroom blocks with concrete block walls, low-pitched roofs, protruding clerestory windows, and internal open courtyards.

The name "Awatapu" was chosen because the school is located on the site of an ancient lagoon. It was an ancient name which celebrated a forgotten event in the history of the "Tangata whenua" – the Rangitane people, whose ancestors had for many centuries padded along the bush tracks or splashed up the creek from the river to enjoy the bounty of Awatapu. If that name had not been chosen, it would have probably soon been lost.

Principals
 John Wall 1976-1989
 Mike O'Connor 1990-1996
 Larry Ching 1996-2002
 Tina Sims 2003-2012
 Gary Yeatman 2013-Present

Colours
The traditional colours of the school are brown and gold but have now changed to black and gold.

Structure

Changes

2015 
2015 saw the renovations of the Gymnasium, which was fully finished in Term 2 of 2016.

Houses
Each student at Awatapu College is assigned a house. Since 2011, each house is named after a famous New Zealand person.

Each house has two student leaders (Year 13 students).

Throughout the year, there are various competitions between the Houses called "House Competitions", additional to the annual Swimming Sports, Athletics Sports and Cross-Country. Previously, each house was named after their colours in Te Reo Māori: Kikorangi, Whero, Kowhai and Kakariki, respectively.

Annual Events and Publications

School Magazine
The School Magazine, or "Yearbook" is given to students at the end of each year, usually on the senior sign out day. Students receive a copy of the magazine for free if they have paid the activity donation in their school fees, or can buy one for just $15. Early on, the magazine was titled "CHRYSALIS", referring to the transition of students from adolescence to more mature adults.

Throughout the year, a committee of Year 13 students and teachers organise the content, design and publishing of the magazine. Usually, the cover of the magazine is a photo of a special event or a submitted design.

In 2013, many older magazines were scanned and uploaded to the school's website by former College Archivist Dr Sue Stirling, making them available for anyone to download and view. These range from 1976 through to 2009. According to Dr Stirling, older versions may be made available.

Senior Honours Awards
The Senior Honours Awards signifies the end of the school year for seniors, and for some Year 13s, it is their last chance to say goodbye. This event is held to honour those who have achieved great success throughout the year academically in years 11, 12 and 13. The event usually consists of musical entertainment and supper afterwards for Year 13s, parents/caregivers, and visitors.

The official party consists of:
 The Senior Management team – the Principal, Deputy Principals and Assistant Principal
 Heads of Departments
 Previous Staff Members of the school (including ex-Principals)
 Staff leaving at the end of the year and special guests (who, for example, may be the local Member of Parliament)
 Representatives from the groups, companies and organisations sponsoring awards and prizes.

The event starts with a Māori Karakia and Mihi, followed by the National Anthem. Afterwards a speech from the chairperson of the Board of Trustees will be read. The Student Co-Leaders for the current year will also read a speech. The event ends with a closing Karakia and a Māori waiata. The awards include Certificates, the Principal's Special Awards, Distinction Awards and Honours Awards, which include the year's Dux Ludorum and Dux Litterarum. The next year's student leaders are also announced.

Sporting rivalries
Awatapu have a local sporting rivalry with Freyberg High School. Awatapu have been the holders of the Mark Ranby Trophy which is a rugby union competition between these schools.

Sports exchange 
Awatapu has an annual sports exchange with Cullinane College, Whanganui for junior students (Years 9, 10 and occasionally, but rarely 11) generally competing in basketball, netball and rugby union. The exchange has been running as long as Cullinane has existed.

For senior students (Years 11, 12 and 13), there is an annual exchange with Makoura College in Masterton.

Notable alumni
 Sam Hansen, also known as PNC, New Zealand rapper.
 Kris Gemmell, Triathlete.
 Dan Ward-Smith, former professional rugby union player.
 Mariano Vivanco, International Photographer.
 Haydn Linsley, member of the boyband Titanium.

Notes

External links

Schools in Palmerston North
Secondary schools in Manawatū-Whanganui
Educational institutions established in 1976
New Zealand secondary schools of S68 plan construction
1976 establishments in New Zealand